Azzinaro is a surname. Notable people with the surname include:

Jerry Azzinaro (born 1958), American football coach
Samuel Azzinaro (born 1943), American politician